Allan Dahl Johansson  (born 5 October 1998) is a Norwegian speed-skater who competes internationally.

He competed for Norway in men's 1500m speedskating event at the 2018 Winter Olympics in PyeongChang, South Korea and placed 35th.

Johansson represents the club Aktiv SK. In December 2017, he set new junior world records in 1,500m and 3,000m.

In March 2018, Johansson won Gold in Junior World Cup in Salt Lake City and set the record in 3,000m.

In 2016, he received more than US$12,000 (94,500 NOK) in sponsorships, with the second largest funding source coming from crowdfunding.  He wrote in his crowdfunding application:"This winter I will focus even more on the World Cup and Junior World Championships. There are a lot of travel and training expenses, and competition everyday. All contributions will come in handy and go exclusively to be faster on skates. Rounds of the season with a three-week gathering in Calgary to train in similar conditions that await me in the Junior World Championships in 2018 in Salt Lake City which is one of my main goals." Johansson won the World Skating Cup 2 years later.

Johansson is the first Norwegian World Junior Allround Speed Skating Champion since Sverre Lunde Pedersen in 2012.

References

External links
 
 
 

1998 births
Sportspeople from Oslo
Norwegian male speed skaters
Speed skaters at the 2016 Winter Youth Olympics
Speed skaters at the 2018 Winter Olympics
Speed skaters at the 2022 Winter Olympics
Olympic speed skaters of Norway
Living people
21st-century Norwegian people
World Single Distances Speed Skating Championships medalists